is the fifth installment in the Time Bokan series, produced by Tatsunoko Productions and directed by Hiroshi Sasagawa. In this series, two royal houses battle for the power to rule the Kingdom of Fir. In order to secure the Kingdom, two representatives go back in time to find the mythical Firebird, which will allow its bearer to become the rightful ruler.

Plot

1000 years in the future, the king who governed the kingdom of Fir, died. An evil dynasty conformed from the capricious Prince Kamaro, his sister Princess Mirenjo, and their two minions (the mechanic Julie Kokematsu and the guard Alan Sukadon) conspire with the objective of governing the kingdom with Kamaro as king. However, a major technicality prevents Kamaro from succeeding with his plan, because whoever finds the mystic Firebird first will become the new and rightful monarch. It travels throughout time and space in the past, disguised as mystic objects of legends, and the evil villains want to capture it. The honorable daughter of the deceased king, Princess Karen, and her guard-robot, Daigoron, travel towards 1981 to ask for help from his ancestors, Wataru Toki and Koyomu Himekuri, in locating the Firebird. When the villains take advantage of the heroes, Wataru Toki transforms into Yattodetaman before fighting against the trio in a comedic battle.

Cast

Heroes
Wataru Toki/Yattodetaman - Kazuyuki Sogabe
Koyomi Himekuri - Masako Miura
Karen-hime - Mika Doi
Daigoron - Yūsaku Yara
Kingorou Tōyama - Osamu Saka

Villains
Mirenjo-hime - Noriko Ohara
Julie Kokematsu - Jōji Yanami
Alan Sukadon - Kazuya Tatekabe
Baron Donfanfan - Masayuki Yamamoto
Prince Komaro - Hiroko Maruyama

Others
Sasayaki - Kei Tomiyama
Koyama - Kazuya Tatekabe
Dara-sen'nin - Ichirō Nagai
Narrator - Kei Tomiyama

Episodes

References

External links
 

1981 anime television series debuts
Fuji TV original programming
Science fiction anime and manga
Tatsunoko Production
Time Bokan Series